Identification with the Aggressor is one of the forms of identification conceptualized by psychoanalysis. Specifically, it is a defence mechanism that indicates taking the role of the aggressor and his functional attributes, or imitating his aggressive and behavioral modality, when a psychological trauma brings about the hopeless dilemma of being either a victim or an abuser. This theoretical construct is also defined as a process of coping with mental distress or as a particular case of zero-sum game.

History 
The concept was first introduced by Sándor Ferenczi in his clinical diary on 24 June 1932 and then developed in his paper "The Passions of Adults and their Influence on the Development of the Character and the Sexuality of the Child" for the 12th International Psycho-Analytic Congress in Wiesbaden, Germany, on 4 September 1932. He further elaborated this work until he published it in 1949 in The International Journal of Psychoanalysis with the new title "Confusion of the Tongues Between the Adults and the Child—(The Language of Tenderness and of Passion)". In 1936, Anna Freud took up and developed the concept in her book The Ego and the Mechanisms of Defence.

Further research

The experiment conducted in 1963 by Elliot Aronson and J. Merrill Carlsmith on the forbidden toy seems to endorse such hypothesis and therefore this type of dynamic: one attributes oneself a mutilation of one's own desire in order to perceive oneself as autarkic, independent and not submissive.

See also
Masters of suspicion
Self-deception
Self-sabotage
Stockholm syndrome

In art
Heauton Timorumenos (Terence)
Heautontimoroumenos (Charles Baudelaire)
H. R. Giger
Alien (franchise)
"Mr. Self Destruct" (Nine Inch Nails)

References

Further reading
 
 
 
 
 

Conformity
Defence mechanisms
Psychoanalytic terminology
1930s neologisms